Unai Arietaleanizbeaskoa Miota (born 16 June 1999), sometimes known as Unai Arieta, is a Spanish professional footballer who plays as a forward for CD Vitoria.

Club career
Born in Bergara, Gipuzkoa, Basque Country, Arieta joined SD Eibar's youth setup from CD Bergara. In July 2019, he was promoted to the reserves in Tercera División.

Arieta made his senior debut on 24 August 2019, starting in a 0–0 away draw against Gernika Club. He scored his first senior goal on 18 September, netting the equalizer in a 2–1 away defeat of CD Basconia, and finished the campaign with eight goals in 27 appearances overall, as his side narrowly missed out promotion in the play-offs.

Arieta made his first team – and La Liga – debut on 30 September 2020, coming on as a second-half substitute for Kike in a 0–1 home loss against Elche CF.

References

External links
 
 
 

1999 births
Living people
People from Bergara
Sportspeople from Gipuzkoa
Spanish footballers
Footballers from the Basque Country (autonomous community)
Association football forwards
La Liga players
Tercera División players
Tercera Federación players
CD Vitoria footballers
SD Eibar footballers